Cleveland Smith: Bounty Hunter (also known as Cleveland Smith: Bounty Hunter: Episode 36) is a 1982 short film written and directed by Josh Becker and starring Bruce Campbell.

Plot
Bruce Campbell plays an Indiana Jones-type explorer named Cleveland Smith, exploring a dark cave and avoiding oncoming boulders, evading chasing Indians and crossing the river in a canoe to escape them. When one of their spears springs a leak in his canoe, he jumps onto a rock that turns out to be a dinosaur, which he also escapes from, only to land in quicksand. When confronted by a nazi (Sam Raimi), Smith hooks his whip on a plane flying low, only to crash into a tree near a native camp, holding Smith's love interest Sally (Cheryl Guttridge) hostage. Smith scares some of the natives off with a ventriloquist dummy, fights off a swordsman and a giant native and finally saves Sally while retrieving a pair of pants known as the "Waders of the Lost Park". Smith falls off a cliff and Sally is captured by the nazi from before, but springs a trap in the process.

Cast
Bruce Campbell as Cleveland Smith
Cheryl Guttridge as Sally
Sam Raimi as the nazi

Natives
Robert Tapert
Nathan Allen
Brian Chambers
Bill Aaron
Scott Spiegel
Bridget Hoffman
Mark Lyman
Bart Pierce
Clay Warnock
Ted Raimi
Bruce Jones

External links
 

1982 short films
1980s English-language films
1982 films
American short films
Films directed by Josh Becker